Nicolae Soare (born 16 April 1964) is a Romanian former footballer who played as a forward. His father who was also named Nicolae Soare was a sports commentator.

International career
Nicolae Soare played one friendly game at international level for Romania in a 1–0 victory against China when he came as a substitute and replaced Romulus Gabor in the 63rd minute of the game.

Honours
Steaua București
Divizia A: 1984–85
ASA Târgu Mureș
Divizia B: 1986–87
Gloria Bistrița
Divizia B: 1989–90

Notes

References

1964 births
Living people
Romanian footballers
Romania under-21 international footballers
Romania international footballers
Association football forwards
Liga I players
Liga II players
FC Politehnica Iași (1945) players
FC Steaua București players
FCM Dunărea Galați players
ASA Târgu Mureș (1962) players
ACF Gloria Bistrița players
Footballers from Bucharest